Lightweight is a weight class in combat sports and rowing.

Boxing

Professional boxing
The lightweight division is over 130 pounds (59 kilograms) and up to 135 pounds (61.2 kilograms) weight class in the sport of boxing.
Notable lightweight boxers include Henry Armstrong, Ken Buchanan, Tony Canzoneri, Pedro Carrasco, Joel Casamayor, Al "Bummy" Davis, Oscar De La Hoya, Roberto Durán, Joe Gans, Artur Grigorian, Benny Leonard, Ray Mancini, Floyd Mayweather Jr., Juan Manuel Márquez, Sugar Shane Mosley, Miguel Ángel González, Carlos Ortiz, Katie Taylor, Edwin Valero, Len Wickwar, Pernell Whitaker, Manny Pacquiao and Ike Williams.

Current world champions

Current world rankings

The Ring

As of December 24, 2022.

Keys:
 Current The Ring world champion

BoxRec

Longest reigning world lightweight champions
Below is a list of "longest reigning lightweight champions" career time as champion (for multiple time champions) does not apply.

Amateur boxing

Olympic Champions

Men’s

 1904 – 
 1908 – 
 1920 – 
 1924 – 
 1928 – 
 1952 – 
 1956 – 
 1960 – 
 1964 – 
 1968 – 
 1972 – 
 1976 – 
 1980 – 
 1984 – 
 1988 – 
 1992 – 
 1996 – 
 2000 – 
 2004 – 
 2008 – 
 2012 – 
 2016 – 
 2020 –

Pan American Champions

 1951 –  Oscar Gallardo (ARG)
 1955 –  Miguel Ángel Péndola (ARG)
 1959 –  Abel Laudonio (ARG)
 1963 –  Roberto Caminero (CUB)
 1967 –  Enrique Regueiferos (CUB)
 1971 –  Luis Dávila (PUR)
 1975 –  Chris Clarke (CAN)
 1979 –  Adolfo Horta (CUB)
 1983 –  Pernell Whitaker (USA)
 1987 –  Julio Gonzáles (CUB)
 1991 –  Julio Gonzáles (CUB)
 1995 –  Julio Gonzáles (CUB)
 1999 –  Mario César Kindelán Mesa (CUB)
 2003 –  Mario César Kindelán Mesa (CUB)
 2007 –  Yordenis Ugás (CUB)
 2011 –  Yasniel Toledo (CUB)

Kickboxing
International Kickboxing Federation (IKF) Lightweight (Pro & Amateur) 127.1 lb - 132 lb or 57.77 kg - 60 kg.
Women's divisions also use this weight class, but usually at a lower weight than the men's divisions.
In Glory promotion, a lightweight division is up to 70 kg (154 lb).

Bare-knuckle boxing
The limit for lightweight generally differs among promotions in bare-knuckle boxing:

Lethwei

Mixed martial arts

In MMA, the lightweight division is from 146 lb (66 kg) to 155 lb (70 kg).

Rowing
Lightweight rowing was a category entered into the Olympic sport, originally due to countries of smaller stature competing with an unfair disadvantage, as rowing favors the taller athlete who has more leverage.

Current Olympic class lightweight events in rowing are a men's lightweight Double Scull, and a women's lightweight Double Scull.

References

External links

Boxing weight classes
Kickboxing weight classes
Wrestling weight classes